Cobitis bilseli is a species of ray-finned fish in the family Cobitidae found only in Turkey.
Its natural habitats are rivers and freshwater lakes. It is threatened by habitat loss.

References

Cobitis
Endemic fauna of Turkey
Freshwater fish of Turkey
Fish described in 1942
Taxonomy articles created by Polbot